

Introduction  

Rafik Halliche is an Algerian former professional footballer who played as a central defender. He was born in 2 September, 1986.

He started playing in 2005 with Hussein Dey, going on to spend the vast majority of his career in Portugal. He also had abroad spells in England with Fulham and in Qatar.

An Algerian international since 2008, Halliche represented the nation in two World Cups and four Africa Cup of Nations, winning the 2019 edition of the latter tournament.

Club career

Early years
Born in Algiers, Halliche began playing football at the age of seven with CREPS Ben Aknoun. After seven years with the club he joined the junior ranks of NA Hussein Dey, making his senior debut on 30 January 2006 in a league match against Paradou AC, coming on as a substitute in the 74th minute.

Nacional
In the January 2008 transfer window, Halliche received interest from several French sides, including AJ Auxerre and Valenciennes FC. However, on 30 January, he signed a four-year contract with Portugal's S.L. Benfica, which immediately loaned him to fellow Primeira Liga team C.D. Nacional until the end of the season.

On 30 March 2008, Halliche made his debut for Nacional, coming on at half-time in a 2–0 home league win against U.D. Leiria. He would go on to make two more appearances as a starter before going back to Benfica at the end of the loan, which was then extended for the entirety of 2008–09 and also the following campaign.

Fulham
On 16 August 2010, Halliche was reported to be linked with a move to Premier League club Fulham, for £1.3 million. The following week, Benfica confirmed the sale of the player, who signed a three-year deal for an undisclosed fee.

Halliche made his official début 8 January 2011, replacing Brede Hangeland in the FA Cup's third round tie against Peterborough United: he conceded a penalty in the 85th minute for tripping Craig Mackail-Smith, in an eventual 6–2 win. His first league appearance came on the 22nd, again from the bench (for Aaron Hughes), in a 2–0 home victory over Stoke City.

Swansea City made a successful loan bid for Halliche during the 2011 summer transfer window, but several weeks after the deadline, FIFA denied international clearance to Swansea for both his move and Darnel Situ's move from RC Lens, leaving the defender as a Fulham player subject to an appeal by the Welsh side.

On 6 December 2011, Halliche went on a week-long trial with Celtic in the Scottish Premier League, but nothing came of it. On 31 August of the following year, Fulham confirmed that the player's contract had been terminated by mutual consent.

Académica
Halliche returned to Portugal on 31 August 2012, signing a two-year deal with Académica de Coimbra. During his spell, he battled for first-choice status with Aníbal Capela and João Real.

Qatar SC
On 13 July 2014, Halliche signed for Qatar SC.

International career
Halliche made his debut for Algeria on 31 May 2008 against Senegal, replacing Anthar Yahia in the 75th minute. On 18 November 2009 he started in the decisive tie-breaker against Egypt for the 2010 FIFA World Cup qualifiers, as the national side won 1–0 in Sudan and returned to the FIFA World Cup 24 years after their last presence. 

Halliche was also summoned for the 2010 Africa Cup of Nations in Angola: he kept the national side's qualification hopes alive after scoring the only goal in a win against Mali, after a loss to Malawi in the opener. In the semi-finals he was sent off in the first half after being given two yellow cards, the last one also resulting in a penalty, in a 0–4 loss to Egypt.

Halliche was picked to represent Algeria in the 2010 World Cup in South Africa, playing all the matches and minutes as the national side only conceded two goals in the group stage, but finished last in their group after failing to score once. He was also selected to the following edition by coach Vahid Halilhodžić, as captain, and contributed decisively to a 4–2 group victory over South Korea on 22 June, heading home from a corner kick for his country's second goal.

Career statistics

International

Scores and results list Algeria's goal tally first, score column indicates score after each Halliche goal.

Honours
Algeria
Africa Cup of Nations: 2019

References

External links

1986 births
Living people
Kabyle people
Footballers from Algiers
Algerian footballers
Association football defenders
Algerian Ligue Professionnelle 1 players
NA Hussein Dey players
Primeira Liga players
S.L. Benfica footballers
C.D. Nacional players
Associação Académica de Coimbra – O.A.F. players
G.D. Estoril Praia players
Moreirense F.C. players
Premier League players
Fulham F.C. players
Qatar Stars League players
Qatari Second Division players
Qatar SC players
Algeria youth international footballers
Algeria under-23 international footballers
Algeria international footballers
2010 Africa Cup of Nations players
2010 FIFA World Cup players
2013 Africa Cup of Nations players
2014 FIFA World Cup players
2015 Africa Cup of Nations players
2019 Africa Cup of Nations players
Algerian expatriate footballers
Expatriate footballers in Portugal
Expatriate footballers in England
Expatriate footballers in Qatar
Algerian expatriate sportspeople in Portugal
Algerian expatriate sportspeople in England
Algerian expatriate sportspeople in Qatar
21st-century Algerian people